Ematheudes nigropunctata is a species of snout moth in the genus Ematheudes. It was described by Henry Legrand in 1966, and is known from the Seychelles and from the highlands of Madagascar.

This species has a wing radius of 7–8 mm, the palpus of the male has a length of 2.8 mm. The eye diameter  is 0.6–0.7 mm. The forewings are pale orange yellow with dark brown near costa at the base, veins with white markings. The hindewings are nearly uniformly yellowish white.

References

Moths described in 1966
Anerastiini
Moths of Madagascar
Fauna of Seychelles
Moths of Africa